Manouchehr Atashi (September 25, 1931 – November 20, 2005) was a Persian poet, writer, and journalist.

He was born in 1931 in Dashtestan, Bushehr province. His poetry is the poetry of the revolting warrior of the humiliated southern tribesman. He takes his work seriously and although attached to his native birthplace his poems are universal scope. In his later works Atashi has relaxed his rhythm and has moved toward direct expression of emotion.

Works
  Poetry Collections by Atashi: 
 Āhang-e digar (Another melody), Tehran, 1959
 Āvāz-e ḵāk (The song of the earth), Tehran, 1967
 Bar entehā-ye aḡāz (At the end of the beginning), Tehran, 1972
 Bārān-e barg-e ḏowq: daftar-e ḡazalhā (The rain of joy: the book of ghazals), with ʿAbdol-Majid Zanguʾi, Tehran, 2001
 Če talḵ ast in sib (How bitter is this apple), Tehran, 1999
 Didār dar falaq (Meeting at dawn), Tehran, 1970
 Ettefāq-e āḵar (The last event), Tehran, 2001
 Gozina-ye ašʿār (Selected poems), Tehran, 1987
 Gandom o gilās (The wheat and the cherry), Tehran, 1992
 Ḡazal-e ḡazalhā-ye Sorenā (The ghazals of Sorena), Tehran, 2005
 Ḥādeṯa dar bāmdād (The event at dawn), Tehran, 2001
 Ḵalij o ḵazar (The Gulf and the Caspian), Tehran, 2002
 Majmuʿa-ye ašʿār (Collected poems), Tehran, 2007
 Rišahā-ye šab (The roots of the night), Tehran, 2005
 Vaṣf-e gol-e suri (In praise of the red rose), Tehran, 1992
 Zibā tar az šekl-e qadim-e jahān (More beautiful than the old shape of the world), Tehran, 1997

References

External links
Iranica Online - Atashi Manuchehr

Persian-language poets
Iranian journalists
20th-century Iranian poets
Iranian translators
People from Borazjan
1931 births
2005 deaths
20th-century translators
Iranian male poets
20th-century male writers
20th-century journalists
Iranian Science and Culture Hall of Fame recipients in Literature and Culture
Iranian people of Kurdish descent